Adrienne Wilkinson is an American actress. She is known for playing Eve, the daughter of Xena in the TV series Xena: Warrior Princess in the fifth and sixth seasons. She has appeared in numerous television series such as Angel, Charmed, ER, and Venice: The Series, and played Captain Lexxa Singh in Star Trek: Renegades.

Wilkinson is also a voice actor who has appeared in numerous video games. She was the voice and model for Maris Brood in Star Wars: The Force Unleashed, Mina Tang in Alpha Protocol, and has also appeared in Star Wars: The Old Republic, The Secret World, and The Evil Within. She also voiced Daughter, the personification of the Light side of the Force in Star Wars: The Clone Wars. Archive audio of her performance as Daughter was used in an episode of Star Wars Rebels.

She is the creator of From the Mouths of Babes, an online interview series that collects impromptu interviews that address Love, Life, and Self.

Biography
Raised mainly in Missouri and having taken dance classes since she was a small child,
 her 'professional debut' came as a dancing popcorn for a live 50's music show when she was 10.

Career
Adrienne Wilkinson is best known for her role of Livia/Eve, the sometimes-warrior-sometimes-saint daughter of Xena on Xena: Warrior Princess. She started on television in an episode of Sweet Valley High in 1996, and moved on to Saved By The Bell: The New Class, Chicken Soup for the Soul and in 2001 she had several guest appearances on Undressed. In 2002 she starred as Nikki on the US version of As If. In 2003 she had a guest spot on Angel as a cheeky flapper from the 1920s, and as Linda Browning in an episode of Days of Our Lives. In 2005 she had guest appearances on Charmed as Phoebe Halliwell's first disguise of the season, Eyes and was a temporary love interest of Dr. Ray Barnett on ER, and Paisley Parker on Goodnight Burbank. She is a series regular on Venice: The Series playing Adrienne, who appears in seasons 2–4.

Her film career includes Lakeshore Drive, (written and directed by Michael Grais and starring Wilkinson and Peter Dobson),  Pomegranate, and she was the female lead in Interceptor Force 2 (AKA: Alpha Force), Missy Blue in The American Failure, and Nancy in Raze. Wilkinson's producer credits include the films Perfection and Seconds, which showcases a woman's struggles with depression and self-injury.

In 2008, she starred in the short film Reflections, directed by Barry Caldwell. She received two acting awards for her performance, and an additional two nominations.

Wilkinson is sought after for her voice over work which includes more than 50 characters in several videogames, animated videos and commercials. She also plays the part of Maris Brood, the female Jedi in Star Wars: The Force Unleashed. She also provided the acting for the physical character as well, as the video game used the most technologically advanced motion capture available to capture her likeness and performance. Wilkinson had a guest role as the voice of Daughter, the personification of the Light side of the Force, on the animated Star Wars: The Clone Wars. Recordings of Wilkinson's vocal performance as Daughter was later used in an episode of the TV series Star Wars Rebels.   She plays Mina Tang in the Alpha Protocol video game, voiced several characters, including Gianna, in Star Wars: The Old Republic, and was the voice of Sarah in the massively multiplayer online game The Secret World: The Black Signal.

Her most recent work includes the pilot for the dramatic series Frequency, the pilot for Bump & Grind, the film Burning Dog, and the feature-length pilot, Star Trek: Renegades, where she plays Captain Lexxa Singh, a descendant of Khan Noonien Singh.

Wilkinson is also known for her charity works which includes a focus on literacy programs, animal welfare and children. Her website hosts an annual charity auction each year which helps to support families dealing with medical expenses. She was also one of many celebrities photographed for the TJ Scott book In the Tub with proceeds going to breast cancer research at UCLA's Jonsson cancer center.

From the Mouths of Babes
In 2011, Wilkinson created From The Mouths of Babes, an online interview series that collects impromptu interviews that address Love, Life, and Self. The project launched on YouTube on May 15, 2012, under the user ID mouthsofbabesnet.

From the Mouths of Babes began to release compilation episodes in September 2013, starting with "Xena on Love." The series had three seasons which ran from 2013 to 2019.

Filmography

Film

Television

Voice work
 2019 Reads for Joan Collins in the audio book for These Are The Voyages - Star Trek: The Original Series, Season One.

Video games

Awards and nominations

References

External links

Actresses from Missouri
American film actresses
American television actresses
American video game actresses
Living people
20th-century American actresses
21st-century American actresses
Year of birth missing (living people)